Peter Edward Rose Sr. (born April 14, 1941), also known by his nickname "Charlie Hustle", is an American former professional baseball player and manager. Rose played in Major League Baseball (MLB) from 1963 to 1986, most prominently as a member of the Cincinnati Reds team known as the Big Red Machine for their dominance of the National League in the 1970s. He also played for the Philadelphia Phillies and the Montreal Expos. During and after his playing career, he served as the manager of the Reds from 1984 to 1989.

Rose was a switch hitter and is the all-time MLB leader in hits (4,256), games played (3,562), at-bats (14,053), singles (3,215), and outs (10,328). He won three World Series, three batting titles, one Most Valuable Player Award, two Gold Gloves, and the Rookie of the Year Award. Rose made 17 All-Star appearances at an unequaled five positions (second baseman, left fielder, right fielder, third baseman, and first baseman). Rose won both of his Gold Gloves when he was an outfielder, in 1969 and 1970.

In August 1989 (his last year as a manager and three years after retiring as a player), Rose was penalized with permanent ineligibility from baseball amidst accusations that he gambled on baseball games while he played for and managed the Reds; the charges of wrongdoing included claims that he bet on his own team. In 1991, the Baseball Hall of Fame formally voted to ban those on the "permanently ineligible" list from induction, after previously excluding such players by informal agreement among voters. After years of public denial, Rose admitted in 2004 that he bet on baseball and on the Reds. The issue of Rose's possible reinstatement and election to the Hall of Fame remains contentious throughout baseball.

In June 2015, ESPN concluded its own investigation of Rose and determined that he had bet on baseball while still a player–manager. The results of the investigation were made public, revealing the records of bets that Rose had made on baseball. U.S. federal authorities had seized the records from one of Rose's associates.

Early life
Rose was born April 14, 1941, in Cincinnati, Ohio, one of four children born to Harry Francis "Pete" and LaVerne Rose. He was a member of the Order of DeMolay as a boy and was encouraged by his parents to participate in sports.

Rose played baseball and football at Western Hills High School. Although he was small for his age, he earned the starting running back position on his freshman football team. When he was not promoted to the varsity football team in his sophomore year, Rose was dejected and soon lost interest in his studies. At the end of the school year, Rose's teachers decreed he would have to attend summer school or be held back. His father decided it would be better for Pete to repeat a year of school than miss a summer playing baseball. It would also give Pete an extra year to mature physically.

When Rose reached his senior year, he had used up his four years of sports eligibility. In the spring of 1960, he joined the Class AA team sponsored by Frisch's Big Boy of Lebanon, Ohio, in the Dayton Amateur League. He played catcher, second base and shortstop and compiled a .626 batting average. This would have been the pinnacle of Rose's baseball career if not for the help of his uncle Buddy Bloebaum. Bloebaum was a "Bird dog" scout for the Reds and he pleaded the case for his nephew. The Reds, who had recently traded away a number of prospects who turned out to be very good, decided to take a chance on Rose. Upon his graduation from high school, he signed a professional contract.

Playing career

Cincinnati Reds (1963–1978)

Rookie of the Year
During a spring training game against the Chicago White Sox in 1963, the Reds' regular second baseman, Don Blasingame, pulled a groin muscle; Rose got his chance and made the most of it. During another spring training game against the New York Yankees, Whitey Ford gave him the derisive nickname "Charlie Hustle" after Rose sprinted to first base after drawing a walk. Despite (or perhaps because of) the manner in which Ford intended it, Rose adopted that nickname as a badge of honor. In Ken Burns' documentary Baseball, Ford's teammate (and best friend) Mickey Mantle claimed that Ford gave Rose the nickname after Rose, playing in left field, made an effort to climb the fence to try to catch a Mantle home run that was about a hundred feet over his head. According to Mantle, when he returned to the dugout, Ford said "Hey, Mick, did you see ole Charley Hustle out there trying to catch that ball?".

Rose made his major league debut on April 8, 1963, against the Pittsburgh Pirates at Crosley Field, and drew a walk in his first plate appearance. After going 0-for-11, Rose got his first Major League hit on April 13, a triple off Pittsburgh's Bob Friend. He hit .273 for the year and won the National League Rookie of the Year Award, collecting 17 of 20 votes.

Rose entered the United States Army Reserves after the 1963 baseball season. He was assigned to Fort Knox for six months of active duty, followed by six years of attendance with a 478th Engineering Battalion USAR unit at Fort Thomas, Kentucky. At Fort Knox, he was a platoon guide and graduated from United States Army Basic Training on January 18, 1964, one week before his marriage to Karolyn Englehardt. Rose remained at Fort Knox to assist his sergeant in training the next platoon and to help another sergeant train the fort's baseball team. Later in his Fort Thomas service, Rose served as a company cook which entailed coming in early for the one weekend/month meeting so that he could leave early enough to participate in Reds home games. Other Reds players in the unit included Johnny Bench, Bobby Tolan, and Darrel Chaney.

Early years

In an April 23, 1964, road contest against the Houston Colt .45's, Rose reached first base on an error in the top of the ninth inning of a scoreless game, and scored on another error. The Colt .45s lost the game in the bottom of the ninth inning and Ken Johnson became the first pitcher to lose a complete game no-hitter. Rose slumped late in the season and was benched; he finished with a .269 average. In order to improve his batting, Rose played in the Venezuelan Winter League with Leones del Caracas team during the 1964–1965 offseason. Rose came back in 1965, leading the league in hits (209) and at-bats (670), and finishing sixth in NL MVP balloting. It was the first of his 10 seasons with 200-plus hits, and his .312 batting average was the first of nine consecutive .300 seasons. He hit a career-high 16 home runs in 1966, then switched positions from second base to right field the following year.

In 1968, Rose started the season with a 22-game hitting streak, missed three weeks (including the All-Star Game) with a broken thumb, then had a 19-game hitting streak late in the season. He had to finish the season 6-for-9 to beat out the Pirates' Matty Alou and win the first of two close NL batting-title races with a .335 average. He finished second to St. Louis Cardinals pitcher Bob Gibson for the NL MVP award, earning six first place votes.

In 1969, Rose set a career-high in batting (.348) and tied his career-best 16 homers. As the Reds' leadoff man, he had 218 hits, walking 88 times and pacing the league in runs with 120. He hit 33 doubles and 11 triples, drove in 82 runs, slugged .512 (by far the highest mark of his long career), and had a .432 OBP (also a career best). Despite Pittsburgh's Roberto Clemente going 3-for-4 in the final game, Rose's 1-for-4 was good enough for the title; Rose finished .348; Clemente .345.

1970 All-Star game
Brand-new Riverfront Stadium had been open for only two weeks on July 14, 1970, when Rose was involved in one of the most infamous plays in All-Star Game history. Facing the California Angels' Clyde Wright in the 12th inning, Rose singled and advanced to second on another single by the Los Angeles Dodgers' Billy Grabarkewitz. The Chicago Cubs' Jim Hickman then singled sharply to center. Amos Otis' throw went past Cleveland Indians catcher Ray Fosse, as Rose barreled over Fosse to score the winning run. Fosse suffered a fractured and separated shoulder, which went undiagnosed until the next year. Fosse continued to hit for average and finished the season at .307, but with diminished power. He had 16 home runs before the break but only two afterwards. He played with the Indians until the 1972 season, but never approached his first-year numbers. The collision also caused Rose to miss three games with a bruised knee.

1973 season
In 1973, Rose led the league with 230 hits and a .338 batting average en route to winning the NL MVP award and leading "the Big Red Machine" to the 1973 National League Championship Series against the New York Mets.

During the fifth inning of Game 3 of the series, Rose was on first base when Joe Morgan hit a double play ball to Mets first baseman John Milner. Rose slid into second base in an attempt to break up the double play. This incited a fight with Mets shortstop Bud Harrelson that resulted in a bench-clearing brawl. When the Reds took the field, the game was nearly called off after the Shea Stadium crowd threw objects at Rose from the stands. The disruption caused Reds manager Sparky Anderson to pull his team off the field until order was restored. Mets manager Yogi Berra and players Willie Mays, Tom Seaver, Cleon Jones, and Rusty Staub were summoned by NL President Chub Feeney out to left field to calm the fans. The Reds ended up losing the game, 9–2, and the NLCS, 3–2, despite Rose's .381 batting average in the series, including his eighth-inning home run to tie Game One and his 12th-inning home run to win Game Four.

The Big Red Machine

 The Cincinnati Reds of the 1970s earned the nickname "the Big Red Machine" as one of the greatest teams in MLB history. Rose's team included future Hall of Famers Johnny Bench, Joe Morgan and Tony Pérez, and he was viewed as one of the club's leaders.

Rose was a significant factor in the Reds' success in 1975 and 1976 when he successfully moved from the outfield to third base. Earlier in his career, the Reds and then-manager Don Heffner tried to force Rose to third base, but Rose chafed at the move and it was soon abandoned. In the spring of 1975, manager Sparky Anderson, knowing how Rose would react to being forced to move, instead asked him if he would do so for the good of the team. Rose immediately agreed. This move strengthened third base and helped to solidify the Reds team for those two championship seasons, because it made room for power hitting outfielder George Foster. In 1975, Rose earned World Series MVP honors in leading the Reds to their first championship since 1940, a seven-game triumph over the Boston Red Sox. Rose led the team with 10 hits and a .370 batting average in the seven games. He was awarded the Hickok Belt as the top professional athlete of the year, as well as Sports Illustrated magazine's "Sportsman of the Year" award.

The following year, he was a major force in helping the Reds repeat as World Series champions. The 1976 Reds swept the Philadelphia Phillies in the best-three-of-five NLCS, followed by a four-game sweep of the Yankees in the World Series. The 1976 club remains the only team since the expansion of the playoffs in 1969 to go undefeated in the postseason, and the Reds franchise has not lost a World Series game since game six in 1975 (wins in game seven in 1975, and four-game sweeps in 1976 and 1990).

3,000th Hit
On May 5, 1978, Rose became the 13th player in major league history to garner his 3,000th career hit when he singled off Montreal Expos pitcher Steve Rogers in front of 37,823 fans at home field Riverfront Stadium.

44-game hitting streak
On June 14, 1978, in Cincinnati, Rose singled in the first inning off Cubs pitcher Dave Roberts; Rose would proceed to get a hit in every game he played until August 1, making a run at Joe DiMaggio's record 56-game hitting streak, which had stood virtually unchallenged for 37 years. The streak started quietly, but by the time it had reached 30 games, the media took notice and a pool of reporters accompanied Rose and the Reds to every game. On July 19, in a game against the Phillies, Rose was hitless going into the eighth inning when he walked. His team was trailing in the ninth inning and the streak appeared over, but the Reds batted through their entire lineup and gave Rose another chance to bat. Rose faced Ron Reed and laid down a perfect bunt single to extend the streak to 32 games.

He would eventually tie Willie Keeler's 1897 single-season National League record at 44 games, but the streak came to an end on August 1 when Gene Garber of the Atlanta Braves struck out Rose in the ninth inning. With two outs and a 2-2 count, Garber decided not to challenge Rose with a fastball. He took full advantage of Rose's predicament by throwing him an off-speed pitch out of the strike zone, which Rose swung at and missed. Rose was livid after the game. He blasted Garber and the Braves for treating the situation "like it was the ninth inning of the seventh game of the World Series". Garber took the comment as a compliment: "I said to myself, 'Well, thanks, Pete. That's how I try to pitch every time I'm in a game.'"

Philadelphia Phillies (1979–1983)
The Philadelphia Phillies had won the National League East three years running (1976–78)—two of which were won with 101-win seasons—but they were unable to make it to the World Series. In 1979, the Phillies believed that Rose was the player who could bring them over the top, and they temporarily made him the highest-paid athlete in team sports when they signed him to a four-year, $3.2-million contract as a free agent. With perennial All-Star Mike Schmidt firmly entrenched at third, Rose made the final position change of his career when he moved to first base.

Although the Phillies missed the postseason in Rose's first year with the team, they earned three division titles (one in the first half of the strike shortened 1981 season), two World Series appearances and their first World Series title in the following four years.

Rose had the worst season of his career in 1983, which was also the season that the Phillies played in their second World Series in four years. The 42-year-old Rose batted only .245 with 121 hits and found himself benched during the latter part of the 1983 season when he appeared periodically to play and pinch hit. Rose did blossom as a pinch-hitter, with eight hits in 21 at-bats, a .381 average.

Rose bounced back during the postseason, batting .375 (6-for-16) during the NLCS against the Los Angeles Dodgers, and .312 (5-for-16) in the World Series against the Baltimore Orioles. Rose went 1-for-8 in the first two games in Baltimore and was benched for game three in Philadelphia, though he grounded out in a pinch-hitting appearance. Rose objected to manager Paul Owens' decision to bench him in a pre-game interview with Howard Cosell of ABC Sports. Rose bounced back with four hits in his last seven at-bats in the remaining two games, though the Phillies lost the Series to the Orioles, four games to one.

Montreal Expos (1984)
Rose was granted an unconditional release from the Phillies in late October 1983. Phillies management wanted to retain Rose for the 1984 season, but he refused to accept a more limited playing role. Months later, he signed a one-year contract with the Montreal Expos. On April 13, 1984, the 21st anniversary of his first career hit, Rose doubled off the Phillies' Jerry Koosman for his 4,000th career hit, becoming the second player in the 4,000 hit club (joining Ty Cobb). Rose played 95 games with the Expos, accumulating 72 hits and 23 RBIs while batting .259. On August 15, 1984, he was traded back to the Reds for infielder Tom Lawless.

Return to Cincinnati (1984–1986)
Upon rejoining the Reds, Rose was immediately named player-manager, replacing Vern Rapp as manager. Despite his .259 average for the season prior to joining the Reds, he hit .365 for the Reds in 26 games (with 35 hits and 11 RBIs), finishing with a .286 overall average—a 41-point improvement over the 1983 season. Furthermore, Rose managed the Reds to a 19–22 record for the remainder of the season. Though the role was once common, to date Rose is the last person to serve as a player-manager in Major League Baseball.

On September 11, 1985, Rose broke Ty Cobb's all-time hits record with his 4,192nd hit, a single to left-center field off San Diego Padres pitcher Eric Show. According to MLB.com, Major League Baseball continues to recognize Cobb's final hit total as 4,191, though independent research has revealed two of Cobb's hits were counted twice. It has been suggested because of this, that Rose actually broke Cobb's record against the Cubs' Reggie Patterson with a single in the first inning of a Reds' 5–5 called game against Chicago on September 8. ABC's Wide World of Sports named Rose its Athlete of the Year that year because Rose broke Cobb's record. Rose accumulated a total of 4,256 hits before his final career at-bat, a strikeout against San Diego's Rich Gossage on August 17, 1986.

In 2010, Deadspin reported Rose used corked bats during his 1985 pursuit of Cobb's record. Two sports memorabilia collectors who owned Rose's game-used bats from that season had the bats x-rayed and found the telltale signs of corking. Rose had previously denied using corked bats.

In a report for ESPN: The Magazine, it was noted that Rose had associated with Tommy Gioiosa, a manager at a Gold's Gym that Rose worked out with in suburban Cincinnati that sold steroids in the late 1980s. He had first met Rose in 1978 in spring training and befriended him. He became a companion and runner to Rose over the next six years before introducing Rose to his gym in 1984. Rose reportedly had thought about taking a shot to help his bat speed near the end of his career, but he told Gioiosa that it was "too late to try something new." Attempts to tell Rose about dealing in the gym fell on dead ears. Gioiosa was later noted as the one individual Rose made his bets with along with later being convicted of conspiracy to sell 110 pounds of cocaine in the Ohio-Kentucky-Indiana area alongside filing a false tax return that included claiming a winning gambling ticket that had actually been Rose's.

Retirement as a player

On November 11, 1986, Rose was dropped from the Reds' 40-man roster to make room for pitcher Pat Pacillo, and he unofficially retired as a player. Rose finished his career with a number of Major League and National League records that have lasted for many years. Rose, always proud of his ability to hit .300 or better in 15 of his 24 playing seasons, had a lifetime .303 batting average.

After retiring as a player, Rose remained with the Reds as manager until August 24, 1989. With a career record of 426–388 as a manager, Rose ranks fifth in Reds history for managerial wins. During Rose's four full seasons at the helm (1985–1988), the Reds posted four second-place finishes in the NL West division. During the mid-1990s there were reports that the yet-to-be named New Orleans franchise of the United Baseball League (UBL) (which was a planned third major league) had offered Rose $500,000 a year to serve as its manager.

Suspensions as a manager

Thirty-day suspension
On April 30, 1988, during a home game against the New York Mets, with two out in the top of the ninth inning, Mookie Wilson hit what looked like a routine ground ball to the shortstop, but the throw to first base was wide and pulled the first baseman's foot off the bag. Umpire Dave Pallone didn't immediately make the safe call and the first baseman waited for the call instead of making a play at the plate, allowing Howard Johnson to score all the way from second base with what would turn out to be the game-winning run. Rose vehemently argued the call and forcefully pushed the umpire twice with his shoulder and forearm, knocking Pallone several feet backward. Pallone promptly ejected Rose, as touching an umpire is grounds for immediate ejection. Rose had to be forcibly restrained by his coaches as he came back at Pallone. He claimed Pallone had initiated the physical contact, and can be seen in the footage of the incident pointing to his cheek, attempting to explain to umpire Eric Gregg that Pallone had poked him in the face. In his book, Pallone wrote an entire chapter on the incident and said he did not touch Rose and National League personnel who investigated the incident later agreed with him. In the time it took to remove Rose from the field, Cincinnati fans began showering the field with objects that included radios and cigarette lighters. Even though the inning was not over, everybody retreated to the dugouts. Reds' owner Marge Schott posted a message onto the electronic billboard, asking fans to stop throwing objects onto the field.

After a 15-minute suspension of play, Pallone left the field and the game was completed with the remaining three umpires. National League president A. Bartlett Giamatti suspended Rose for 30 days, which was the longest suspension levied for an on-field incident involving a manager. He also fined Rose "a substantial amount"; the actual amount was not disclosed. Giamatti said; "Such incidents are not business as usual and will not be allowed to become so."

Giamatti also summoned the Reds' on-air radio announcers, Marty Brennaman and Joe Nuxhall, to his office in New York City and chastised them for inciting the fan response with "inflammatory and completely irresponsible remarks." Giamatti told Brennaman and Nuxhall, "There is no excuse for encouraging a situation where the physical safety and well-being of any individual is put significantly at risk. Nothing justifies such unprofessional behavior."

Permanent ineligibility

Amid reports that he had bet on baseball, Rose was informally questioned in February 1989 by Commissioner of Baseball Peter Ueberroth and NL President Bart Giamatti. Rose (with his lawyer present) had stated that he had bet on football, basketball and horse racing, but he vehemently denied the allegations of betting on baseball. By this time, MLB owners had elected Giamatti to succeed Ueberroth, and the outgoing Commissioner decided to leave the matter to be dealt with by his successor. In the meantime, Sports Illustrated gave the public their first detailed report of the allegations that Rose had placed bets on baseball games on March 21, 1989, in the cover story of the issue dated April 3, 1989. Giamatti assumed office as the seventh Commissioner of Baseball on April 1. Three days later, lawyer John M. Dowd was retained to investigate the charges against Rose.

Investigation

Dowd interviewed many of Rose's associates, including alleged bookies and bet runners. He delivered a summary of his findings to the Commissioner in May. In it, Dowd documented Rose's alleged gambling activities in 1985 and 1986 and compiled a day-by-day account of Rose's alleged betting on baseball games in 1987. The Dowd Report documented alleged bets on 52 Reds games in 1987, citing Rose wagered a minimum of $10,000 a day; whereas others allegedly involved in the activities claim that number was actually $2,000 a day.

Response

Rose continued to deny all of the accusations against him and refused to appear at a hearing with Giamatti on the matter. He filed a lawsuit in Hamilton County Court of Common Pleas, the Ohio state trial court covering Cincinnati, alleging that the Commissioner had prejudged the case and could not provide a fair hearing. The Court of Common Pleas issued a temporary restraining order to delay the hearing, but Giamatti sought to remove the case to the federal United States District Court for the Southern District of Ohio. The Southern District of Ohio granted Giamatti's removal petition. The parties thereafter entered settlement negotiations, as the federal court, whose judges were lifetime appointees and whose jurisdiction included large areas where the Reds were less popular, was seen to be a less favorable forum for Rose than a state court covering only Cincinnati and its immediate environs and whose judges faced election every six years.

Aftermath
On August 24, 1989, Rose voluntarily accepted a permanent place on baseball's ineligible list. Rose accepted that there was a factual reason for the ban. In return, Major League Baseball agreed to make no formal finding with regard to the gambling allegations. According to baseball's rules, Rose could apply for reinstatement in one year but Bart Giamatti said, "There is absolutely no deal for reinstatement. That is exactly what we did not agree to in terms of a fixed number of years." Rose, with a 412–373 record, was replaced as Reds manager by Tommy Helms. Rose began therapy with a psychiatrist for treatment of a gambling addiction.

Giamatti died of a heart attack on September 1, 1989, eight days after announcing Rose's suspension.

Betting for or against

The Dowd Report says, "no evidence was discovered that Rose bet against the Reds," but investigator Dowd stated in a December 2002 interview that he believed Rose probably bet against the Reds while managing them. Those critical of Rose's behavior, including Ohio's own Hall of Fame baseball reporter, Hal McCoy, have observed that "the major problem with Rose betting on baseball, particularly the Reds, is that as manager he could control games, make decisions that could enhance his chances of winning his bets, thus jeopardizing the integrity of the game." The Major League Baseball rule that Rose violated prohibits any bet on a game the bettor is involved in, making no distinction between betting for or against one's team. The rule is: "Rule 21 Misconduct, (d) Betting on Ball Games, Any player, umpire, or club, or league official, or employee, who shall bet any sum whatsoever upon any baseball game in connection with which the bettor has a duty to perform shall be declared permanently ineligible."

Reinstatement efforts
In 1992, Rose applied for reinstatement. Fay Vincent, who as deputy commissioner had played a key role in negotiating the agreement banning Rose before becoming commissioner after Giamatti's death, never acted on Rose's application. In September 1998, Rose applied for reinstatement with Vincent's successor Bud Selig, but Selig also never acted on it.

In public comments, Selig said he saw no reason to reconsider Rose's punishment; however, in March 2003, Selig acknowledged that he was considering Rose's application, leading to speculation that Rose's return might be imminent. Ultimately, however, Selig took no action.

Representatives for Rose applied in 2015 for reinstatement with Selig's successor, Rob Manfred. However, on December 15, 2015, Manfred rejected the request. Manfred stated that Rose had not been forthcoming about his gambling and that Rose (who by this time was living in Las Vegas) was still betting on baseball. Although Rose was placing legal bets by this time, MLB has long barred players, managers, and coaches from any form of gambling on baseball, legal or otherwise. He also felt that Rose did not have "a mature understanding of his wrongful conduct" and the damage it had done to the game. For these reasons, Manfred concluded that allowing him back in the game would be an "unacceptable risk".

In 2020 Pete Rose, along with his lawyers, again applied for reinstatement, in his petition he states that his gambling did not affect the outcome of games, whereas other players who used steroids or used electronic signs to steal catchers signals did and subsequently they were not banned. He also sent a petition along with it to the Hall of Fame's board of directors asking them to repeal their 1991 ban on players on the ineligible list. Neither commissioner Manfred nor the Hall of Fame's directors have responded to this petition. 

In 2022 Rose applied again for reinstatement. In a letter to Rob Manfred, Rose states he wants to make it clear he’s sorry for what he did and asks for forgiveness. Rose says he wrote the letter “because I still think every day about what it would mean to be considered for the Hall of Fame”.

Tax evasion
On April 20, 1990, Rose entered a plea of guilty to two charges of filing false income tax returns not showing income he received from selling autographs and memorabilia and from horse racing winnings. On July 19, Rose was sentenced to five months in the medium security prison camp at the United States Penitentiary in Marion, Illinois, and fined $50,000.

He was released on January 7, 1991, after having paid $366,041 in back taxes and interest and was required to perform 1,000 hours of community service.

Hall of Fame eligibility
On February 4, 1991, the Hall of Fame voted formally to exclude individuals on the permanently ineligible list from being inducted into the Hall of Fame by way of the Baseball Writers' Association of America vote. However, a longstanding unwritten rule already barred permanently ineligible players from enshrinement. Rose and Roberto Alomar (who was banned for sexual misconduct towards a female Toronto Blue Jays staffer) are the only living former players on the ineligible list (although former executives Chris Correa and John Coppolella are also on the list for other infractions); Alomar was enshrined several years before his banishment, and his plaque remains in Cooperstown. Players who were not selected by the BBWAA could be considered by the Veterans Committee in the first year after they would have lost their place on the Baseball Writers' ballot. Under the Hall's rules at the time, players could appear on the ballot for only 15 years, beginning five years after they retired. Had he not been banned from baseball, Rose's name could have been on the writers' ballot beginning in 1992 and ending in 2006. He would have been eligible for consideration by the Veterans Committee in 2007, but did not appear on the ballot. In 2008, the Veterans Committee barred players and managers on the ineligible list from consideration. Eight years later, Rose petitioned the Hall of Fame to permit his name to be submitted for induction, saying that he had not expected to be prevented from Hall of Fame consideration when agreeing to the lifetime ban.

Although ineligible for the Baseball Hall of Fame, Rose was inducted into the Cincinnati Reds Hall of Fame in 2016.

MLB All-Century Team
In 1999, Rose was selected as an outfielder on the Major League Baseball All-Century Team. To select the team, a panel of experts first compiled a list of the 100 greatest players from the past century. Fans then voted on the players using paper and online ballots.

An exception was made to his ban to allow him to participate in the pre-game introduction of the All-Century team before Game 2 of the 1999 World Series between the Braves and Yankees. Despite never having been a member of the Braves, Rose received the loudest ovation of the All-Century team members from the crowd at Turner Field in Atlanta, Georgia.

After the ceremony on live television, NBC's Jim Gray repeatedly asked Rose if he was ready to admit to betting on baseball and apologize. Many people were outraged over Gray's aggressive questioning, feeling that it detracted from the ceremony. In protest, Yankees outfielder Chad Curtis refused to speak with Gray after his game-winning home run in Game 3. Earlier that season, Rose had been ranked at number 25 on The Sporting News list of the 100 Greatest Baseball Players.

In 2002, Rose again appeared during the 2002 World Series in a Mastercard-sponsored event recalling "Baseball's Most Memorable Moments." Fans voted Rose's record-breaking hit over Ty Cobb as the 6th most memorable moment in baseball history.

While allowing him to participate in the All-Century Team, and a September 2010 celebration at Great American Ball Park of the 25th anniversary of Rose's 4,192nd hit, MLB has refused to allow him to participate in other events in Cincinnati, such as the 25th anniversary reunion of the Big Red Machine, the closing of Cinergy Field, and the opening of Great American Ball Park, as well as the closing of Veterans Stadium in Philadelphia and 1980 Phillies anniversary celebrations.
The year before his retirement in 2015, Selig stated that Rose could participate in the festivities for the 2015 MLB All-Star Game, which was held in Cincinnati (within subjective guidelines), and Rose took the field alongside Reds teammates prior to the game. In 2016, Rose had his jersey retired by the Reds, which had to be approved by the league.

Coming clean
In his autobiography My Prison Without Bars, published by Rodale, Inc. in Emmaus, Pennsylvania on January 8, 2004, Rose admitted publicly to betting on baseball games and other sports while playing for and managing the Reds. He also admitted to betting on Reds games, but said he never bet against the Reds. He repeated his admissions in an interview on the ABC news program Primetime Thursday. He also said in the book he hoped his admissions would help end his ban from baseball so he could reapply for reinstatement.

In 2004, ESPN broadcast the television film Hustle starring Tom Sizemore and directed by Peter Bogdanovich, which was primarily based on the Dowd Report without Pete Rose's involvement.

In March 2007, during an interview on The Dan Patrick Show on ESPN Radio, Rose said, "I bet on my team every night. I didn't bet on my team four nights a week. I bet on my team to win every night because I loved my team, I believed in my team," he said. "I did everything in my power every night to win that game."

John Dowd disputed Rose's contention he bet on the Reds every night, asserting Rose did not bet on his team when Mario Soto or Bill Gullickson pitched.  A notebook detailing Rose's daily betting activity shows Rose placed bets on five of the six games Soto started in 1987. The lone exception was April 26, 1987, when Rose allegedly placed bets on hockey and basketball games but no baseball games. There were also four games Rose did not bet on the Reds in which Gullickson started.

The criticism of Rose did not diminish after this admission—some Rose supporters were outraged Rose would reverse 15 years of denial as part of a book publicity tour. In addition, the timing was called into question; by making his admission just two days after the Baseball Hall of Fame announced its class of 2004 inductees, Rose appeared to be linking himself publicly to the Hall.

Even after his 2004 admission of gambling, Rose had described his violation of MLB rules with what journalist Kostya Kennedy described as "a kind of swagger, that familiar screw-you defiance". On September 11, 2010, however, at a roast of Rose held at Hollywood Casino Lawrenceburg in Indiana on the 25th anniversary of his 4,192nd hit and attended by many teammates, Rose wept while acknowledging he had "disrespected baseball". He apologized to Pérez and other members of the Big Red Machine, stating, "I guarantee everyone in this room I will never disrespect you again. I love the fans, I love the game of baseball, and I love Cincinnati baseball". His words and crying surprised those present; a Cincinnati Enquirer reporter said, "It felt completely unscripted, completely sincere and very powerful. I had covered Rose for more than 25 years and hadn't ever heard him like that."

WWE
Between 1998 and 2000, Rose appeared at World Wrestling Federation's (now WWE) annual WrestleMania pay-per-view event, in what became a running gag. At WrestleMania XIV he served as "guest ring announcer" during a match between Kane and the Undertaker, before which he took a Tombstone Piledriver from Kane (also nicknamed "The Big Red Machine"). For the next year's WrestleMania XV, Rose was portrayed as seeking revenge. To do so, he dressed as the San Diego Chicken and "attacked" Kane before his scheduled match, only to take another Tombstone. He returned for a third time the following year, at WrestleMania 2000, but again was thwarted by Kane, as well as Rikishi, his tag team partner that night.

In addition to these three appearances, he appeared in a Halloween-themed commercial for WWE's No Mercy event in 2002 and was chokeslammed by Kane. In 2004, Rose was inducted into the "Celebrity Wing" of the WWE Hall of Fame class of 2004. He was the first celebrity to go into the Hall, and was inducted at a ceremony prior to WrestleMania XX by Kane.

On March 22, 2010, he was the guest host on WWE Raw, which was the last episode of Raw before WrestleMania XXVI. As his first order of business, he set up a match between Shawn Michaels and Kane, which Michaels won. Later that night, Kane attacked Rose offscreen.

Rose was briefly mentioned on WWE television again on August 27, 2012. In an anger management segment, Kane stated, "For reasons never quite explained, I have an unhealthy obsession with torturing Pete Rose." Rose was later interviewed on WWE.com about his experiences with Kane's anger.

Return to managing
On June 16, 2014, Rose returned to managing a professional baseball team for one game, serving as guest manager of the Bridgeport Bluefish, a Connecticut-based team. Rose's cameo as a manager did not violate his lifetime ban, as the Bluefish played in the independent Atlantic League of Professional Baseball, which is unaffiliated with Major League Baseball.  Rose also coached first base and signed autographs for fans, as the Bluefish defeated the Lancaster Barnstormers, 2–0.

Fox Sports
On April 16, 2015, it was announced that Rose had been hired by Fox Sports to serve as a guest studio color analyst for MLB coverage on Fox and Fox Sports 1, appearing on the MLB on Fox pregame show as well as MLB Whiparound, America's Pregame, and Fox Sports Live. He made his Fox Sports 1 debut on May 11, 2015. He was let go in August of 2017 when the details of his sexual relationship with a teenager in the 1970s was revealed after he attempted to sue John Dowd.

Personal life
Rose married Karolyn Englehardt on January 25, 1964, and the couple had two children, daughter Fawn (b. 1964) and son Pete Rose Jr. (b. 1969). The couple divorced in 1980. In 1978, a paternity suit was filed naming Rose as the father of Morgan Erin Rubio. In a 1996 settlement of the lawsuit, Rose acknowledged that Rubio was his daughter.

Rose married his second wife, Carol J. Woliung, in 1984. They have two children, son Tyler (b. 1984), and daughter Cara (b. 1989), who was born two days before Rose's banishment from MLB. Rose filed for divorce from Carol in March 2011. The 69-year-old Rose cited irreconcilable differences for the split, but his petition did not offer any additional details. Rose did not include a date for their separation. Documents in the filing said that Rose was looking to acquire all memorabilia and other possessions from before the marriage.

While separated from his second wife, Rose began an open relationship with Kiana Kim, a Playboy model. During a 2009 interview, Rose discussed his relationship with Kim, stating, "My girl has finally decided to try to shoot for Playboy, and they were kind enough to give her an opportunity to come to Houston for an interview, and we're excited about that." A 2013 reality show called Pete Rose: Hits & Mrs., following the life of Rose and Kim, and his two stepchildren Cassie and Ashton premiered on TLC on January 14, 2013. Rose and Kim have been engaged since 2011. They appeared on a national Sketchers commercial which aired during the 2014 Super Bowl.

Two of Rose's children have lived public lives. Cara has worked as a television actress, appearing as a regular in the first season of the soap opera Passions and playing a recurring role on Melrose Place. She uses the stage name "Chea Courtney". His older son, Pete Rose Jr., spent 16 years as a minor league baseball player, advancing to the majors once for an 11-game stint with the Cincinnati Reds in 1997.

Pete Rose was referenced in the lyrics of the song "Zanzibar" originally released by Billy Joel in 1978 on the 52nd Street album: "Rose, he knows he's such a credit to the game / But the Yankees grab the headlines every time." In later live performances instead of singing of Rose being "a credit to the game," Joel jokes that he will "never make the Hall of Fame," although he modified this to "Hall of Popularity" during a concert in Cincinnati.

, Rose earns more than $1,000,000 annually from many paid public appearances and autograph signings. These include appearances in Cooperstown, New York, around the time of the Hall of Fame induction week-end each year. Although Rose does not stay at the Otesaga Resort Hotel with other baseball people and cannot attend the ceremonies, many fans gather for his autograph.

Rose filed a defamation suit against attorney John M. Dowd in July 2016, after Dowd had alleged in a radio interview the previous summer that Rose had committed statutory rape. A court document during the suit was released in July 2017 with a sworn statement alleging Rose had engaged in a sexual relationship with a minor in the 1970s. In light of these new allegations, the Phillies cancelled his upcoming Philadelphia Baseball Wall of Fame ceremony. On December 15, 2017, a judge dismissed the defamation lawsuit when both parties reached an agreement.

Records and achievements
Aside from the numerous records he set and individual titles he won, Rose was also honored with the 1968 Hutch Award, the 1969 Lou Gehrig Memorial Award, and the 1976 Roberto Clemente Award. Despite his status of permanent ineligibility for the Hall of Fame, Rose received 9.5% of the votes (17th place overall) in his first year on the ballot for the Baseball Writers. He continued to receive votes for the next two years but failed to achieve the minimum of 5% to keep him on the ballot. Rose was inducted into the Baseball Reliquary's Shrine of the Eternals in 2010.

Rose made the National League All-Star roster 17 times. Only three National League players (Hank Aaron, Willie Mays, and Stan Musial) and five American League players (Mickey Mantle, Cal Ripken, Ted Williams, Rod Carew, and Carl Yastrzemski) have more appearances. He was voted the National League's Most Valuable Player in 1973, but also finished in the top five vote-getters in 1968, 1969, 1975, and 1976. He led the league in batting average three times (1968, 1969, 1973), in plate appearances and hits seven times, in games played and doubles five times, in at-bats and runs scored four times, and in on-base percentage twice (1968, 1979).

Major League records:
Most career at-bats – 14,053
Most career plate appearances – 15,890
Most career hits – 4,256
Most career singles – 3,215
Most career times on base – 5,929
Most career outs – 10,328
Most career games played – 3,562
Most career winning games played – 1,972
Only player to play at least 500 games at five different positions – 1B (939), LF (671), 3B (634), 2B (628), RF (595)
Most career runs by a switch hitter – 2,165
Most career doubles by a switch hitter – 746
Most career walks by a switch hitter – 1,566
Most career total bases by a switch hitter – 5,752
Most seasons of 200 or more hits – 10 (shared)
Most consecutive seasons of 100 or more hits – 23
Most consecutive seasons with 600 or more at-bats – 13 (1968–1980) (shared)
Most seasons with 600 at-bats – 17
Most seasons with 150 or more games played – 17
Most seasons with 100 or more games played – 23
National League records:
Most years played – 24
Most consecutive years played – 24
Most career runs – 2,165
Most career doubles – 746
Most career games with 5 or more hits – 10
Modern (post-1900) NL record for longest consecutive-game hitting streak NL – 44
Modern record for most hitting streaks of 20 or more consecutive games – 7

Rose retired in 1986 with the highest modern-day career fielding percentage for a right fielder at 99.14% and the highest National League modern-day career fielding percentage for a left fielder at 99.07%, behind only 
the American League's Joe Rudi and then active players Gary Roenicke and Brian Downing, who also primarily played in the American League.

See also

3,000-hit club
List of Major League Baseball hit records
List of Major League Baseball doubles records
Major League Baseball scandals
DHL Hometown Heroes
Major League Baseball All-Century Team
List of Major League Baseball career records
List of Major League Baseball single-season records
List of Major League Baseball career hits leaders
List of Major League Baseball career doubles leaders
List of Major League Baseball career triples leaders
List of Major League Baseball career runs scored leaders
List of Major League Baseball career runs batted in leaders
List of Major League Baseball career stolen bases leaders
List of Major League Baseball batting champions
List of Major League Baseball annual runs scored leaders
List of Major League Baseball annual doubles leaders
List of Major League Baseball player-managers
Major League Baseball consecutive games played streaks
Major League Baseball titles leaders

References

External links

1941 births
Living people
American expatriate baseball players in Canada
Major League Baseball left fielders
Major League Baseball second basemen
Major League Baseball first basemen
Cincinnati Reds players
Philadelphia Phillies players
Montreal Expos players
Baseball players from Cincinnati
National League All-Stars
National League Most Valuable Player Award winners
Major League Baseball Rookie of the Year Award winners
World Series Most Valuable Player Award winners
National League batting champions
Gold Glove Award winners
Silver Slugger Award winners
Cincinnati Reds managers
Major League Baseball player-managers
Major League Baseball players with retired numbers
Geneva Redlegs players
Leones del Caracas players
American expatriate baseball players in Venezuela
Macon Peaches players
Tampa Tarpons (1957–1987) players
Major League Baseball broadcasters
Major League Baseball controversies
Sportspeople involved in betting scandals
American sportspeople convicted of crimes
American people convicted of tax crimes
Sportspeople banned for life
Participants in American reality television series
Prisoners and detainees of the United States federal government
WWE Hall of Fame inductees
Pew Fellows in the Arts
United States Army soldiers
Bridgeport Bluefish guest managers